Pedapulipaka is a part of Vijayawada in Penamaluru Mandal of Krishna District, Andhra Pradesh.
Neighbourhoods in Vijayawada

Government Bodies

Pedapulipaka's latest Government Leaders are

 Sarpanch/President was Mr. Pulipaka Irmiya from 2015 to present.
 MLA was Mr. Kolusus Parthasarathy from 2019 to present 
 MP was Mr. Vallabhaneni Balasouri from 2019 to present
 CM was Mr. Y. S. Jaganmohan Reddy from 2019 to present 
 PM was Mr. Narendra Modi from 2014 to present

Geography

Pedapulipaka village (gram panchayat) is located in Penamaluru Mandal of Krishna district in Andhra Pradesh, India. It is 10 km away from sub-district headquarter Penamaluru, and 70 km away from district headquarter Machilipatnam.

 The total geographical area of village is 969 hectares. 
 Pedapulipaka has a total population of 9,108 peoples. 
 There are about 750 houses in Pedapulipaka village. 
 Vijayawada is nearest town to Pedapulipaka which is approximately 8 km away.
 The nearest place is 5 km away west - Auto Nagar (old checkpost).
 The nearest village was 5 km away east - Tadigadapa.

Transportation
There is no private transportation available here, such as auto rickshaws, cabs, and private buses, so people rely on APSRTC buses or personal vehicles such as bikes and cars.

Education
There are both government and private education facilities in and near the village.

Health Facilities
 There are first-aid centers available - run by reputed RMP Doctors.
 Time Hospital - is known as the best private hospital near Tadigadapa.

Post Office and banking
 PIN Code is 521137
 Post Office is behind Panchayathi Office Road.

Agriculture
The village produces rice, sugarcane, corn and vegetables.

References

Villages in Krishna district